The 19003/19004 Khandesh Express is an Express train belonging to Western Railway zone that runs between  and  in India. It is currently being operated with 19003/19004 train numbers on tri-weekly basis.

Coach composition

The train has standard ICF rakes with max speed of 110 km/h. The train consists of 15 coaches:

 1 AC II Tier
 2 AC III Tier
 4 Sleeper Coaches
 6 General Unreserved
 2 Seating cum Luggage Rake

Service

19003/ Bandra Terminus–Bhusaval Khandesh Express has an average speed of 49 km/h and covers 576 km in 11h 40m.

The 19004/ Bhusaval–Bandra Terminus Khandesh Express has an average speed of 50 km/h and covers 576 km in 11h 25m.

Route and halts 

The important halts of the train are:

Schedule

Traction

Both trains are hauled by a Vadodara-based WAP-4E or WAP-5.

See also 

 Pune–Bhusaval Express

Notes

References 

Transport in Mumbai
Transport in Bhusawal
Named passenger trains of India
Express trains in India
Rail transport in Maharashtra
Rail transport in Gujarat
Railway services introduced in 2019